In probability theory and statistics, the Conway–Maxwell–binomial (CMB) distribution is a three parameter discrete probability distribution that generalises the binomial distribution in an analogous manner to the way that the Conway–Maxwell–Poisson distribution generalises the Poisson distribution.  The CMB distribution can be used to model both positive and negative association among the Bernoulli summands,.

The distribution was introduced by Shumeli et al. (2005), and the name Conway–Maxwell–binomial distribution was introduced independently by Kadane (2016)  and Daly and Gaunt (2016).

Probability mass function 

The Conway–Maxwell–binomial (CMB) distribution has probability mass function

The normalizing constant  is defined by

If a random variable  has the above mass function, then we write .

The case  is the usual binomial distribution .

Relation to Conway–Maxwell–Poisson distribution 

The following relationship between Conway–Maxwell–Poisson (CMP) and CMB random variables  generalises a well-known result concerning Poisson and binomial random variables.

Sum of possibly associated Bernoulli random variables 

The random variable  may be written  as a sum of exchangeable Bernoulli random variables  satisfying

where .  Note that  in general, unless .

Generating functions 

Let

Then, the probability generating function, moment generating function and characteristic function are given, respectively, by:

Moments 

For general , there do not exist closed form expressions for the moments of the CMB distribution.  The following neat formula is available, however.  Let  denote the falling factorial.  Let , where .  Then

Mode 

Let  and define

Stein characterisation 

Then

Approximation by the Conway–Maxwell–Poisson distribution 

This result generalises the classical Poisson approximation of the binomial distribution.

Conway–Maxwell–Poisson binomial distribution 

Let  be Bernoulli random variables with joint distribution given by

where  and the normalizing constant  is given by

where

Let .  Then  has mass function

This distribution generalises the Poisson binomial distribution in a way analogous to the CMP and CMB generalisations of the Poisson and binomial distributions. Such a random variable is therefore said  to follow the Conway–Maxwell–Poisson binomial (CMPB) distribution.

The case  is the usual Poisson binomial distribution and the case  is the  distribution.

References 

Discrete distributions